The Fort Sumner Community House, at the Junction of U.S. Route 84 and Baker Avenue in Fort Sumner, New Mexico, was erected in 1939.  It was listed on the National Register of Historic Places in 2003.

It includes the Fort Sumner Women's Club, in a c.1942 addition along its south side.  It was built as a Works Progress Administration project out of adobe brick.

References

Women's club buildings
National Register of Historic Places in De Baca County, New Mexico
Buildings and structures completed in 1939
Women in New Mexico